Joseph Francis Burns  (March 26, 1889 – July 12, 1987) was a Major League Baseball outfielder. He played in one game for the 1910 Cincinnati Reds and in four games for the 1913 Detroit Tigers. He continued to play in the minor leagues until 1925.

Sources

Major League Baseball outfielders
Cincinnati Reds players
Detroit Tigers players
Baseball players from Massachusetts
Lowell Grays players
Portland Duffs players
Reading Coal Barons players
Reading Marines players
Reading Aces players
Buffalo Bisons (minor league) players
Bridgeport Bears (baseball) players
1889 births
1987 deaths
People from Ipswich, Massachusetts
Sportspeople from Essex County, Massachusetts